William Ellsworth Tou Velle (November 23, 1862 – August 14, 1951) was an American lawyer and politician who served two terms as a U.S. Representative from Ohio from 1907 to 1911.

Biography 
Born in Celina, Ohio, November 23, 1862, attended the public schools and was graduated from Celina High School in 1879, Tou Velle was appointed postmaster of Celina, Ohio, on May 27, 1885, and served until June 14, 1888, when a successor was appointed.
He was graduated from Cincinnati Law School in 1889.
He was admitted to the bar the same year and commenced practice in Celina.

Tou Velle was elected as a Democrat to the Sixtieth and Sixty-first Congresses (March 4, 1907 – March 3, 1911).
He did not seek renomination in 1910.
He resumed the practice of law.
He served as president of the First National Bank of Celina.
He died in Celina, Ohio, August 14, 1951.
He was interred in North Grove Cemetery.

Sources

1951 deaths
People from Celina, Ohio
Ohio lawyers
1862 births
University of Cincinnati College of Law alumni
Democratic Party members of the United States House of Representatives from Ohio